Ajanur (also anglicized Ajanoor) is a grama panchayat and also a village of the same name in Kasargode district, Kerala state, India. It is the fifth largest town in Kasaragod district.

Ajanur vs. Kanhangad
Ajanur is in fact a bureaucratic nicety.  Some parts of Kanhangad town is put under an administrative unit called Ajanur Panchayath.  The suburb continues to be part and parcel of Kanhangad town.

Ajanur is just north of Kanhangad, stretching for some 5 km along the Kanyakumari-Panavel Road, encompassing an area of some 28 km2.
Total population was recorded as 42,467 in the 2001 Indian census, amounting to a population density of 1,526 per km2.

Wards in the local administration
Ajanur panchayat consists of the following 23 villages or "wards":

Notable people
Ajanur is the birthplace of the poet P. Kunhiraman Nair, whose younger brother P. Krishnan Nair, was the first president of the panchayat.

Ajanur was  also home for the socialist party leader C. M. Padmanabhan Nair.

Temples
The Madiyan Koolom  temple is situated in Ajanur.  The main deity of the temple is Bhadrakali.

Education
Educational institutions in Ajanur are Govt. Higher Secondary School, Ravaneshwaram, Maha Kavi P. Kunhiraman Nair Memorial High School, Iqbal High School and Crescent English Medium School.

Transportation
Local roads have access to NH.66 which connects to Mangalore in the north and Calicut in the south. The nearest railway station is Kanhangad on Mangalore-Palakkad line. There are airports at Mangalore and Calicut.

References

Kasargod district official website
LSGI Election 2010

External links
Chithari

Kanhangad area